Jalen Philpot (born July 26, 2000) is a professional Canadian football wide receiver for the Calgary Stampeders of the Canadian Football League (CFL).

University career

After being recruited by multiple U Sports football programs, Philpot committed to play for the Calgary Dinos in January 2018. In his rookie year, in 2018, he played in all eight regular season games where he had 18 catches for 323 yards and three touchdowns.

In 2019, he had a breakout year as he recorded 52 catches (second in U Sports) for 767 yards (fourth) and eight touchdowns (first). For his outstanding sophomore season, he was named a Canada West All-Star and U Sports First Team All-Canadian. He continued to find success though the playoffs that year as the Dinos went all the way to the 55th Vanier Cup game. In the championship game against the Montreal Carabins, Philpot recorded four catches for a team-leading 116 receiving yards and one touchdown as the Dinos emerged victorious and he became a Vanier Cup champion.

Philpot did not play in 2020 due to the cancellation of the 2020 U Sports football season, but returned for his third season in 2021, where he led all of U Sports in receiving yards with 799 yards from 42 receptions and scored three touchdowns in just six games. He was again named a Canada West All-Star and U Sports First Team All-Canadian, but the Dinos failed to qualify for the playoffs and defend their Vanier Cup title. For his U Sports career, he played in 22 regular season games where he had 113 receptions for 1,889 yards and ten touchdowns.

Professional career
Philpot was ranked as the fifth best player in the Canadian Football League's Amateur Scouting Bureau final rankings for players eligible in the 2022 CFL Draft, and second by players in U Sports. He was then drafted in the first round, fifth overall, in the 2022 draft by the Calgary Stampeders and signed with the team on May 9, 2022. Philpot began the 2022 season on the injured list, but made his professional debut in the third game of the season on June 25, 2022, against the Edmonton Elks, where he had one catch for eight yards, one carry for seven yards, and three kickoff returns for 67 yards. He scored his first career touchdown on August 13, 2022, against his hometown BC Lions, when he caught a 19-yard pass from Bo Levi Mitchell.

Personal life
Philpot was born in Delta, British Columbia to parents Colleen Purcell and Cory Philpot. His father played in six seasons in the Canadian Football League as a running back and enrolled Philpot in football when he was six years old. Philpot has a twin brother, Tyson Philpot, who is younger by seven minutes, who also plays professionally as a receiver for the Montreal Alouettes.

References

External links
Calgary Stampeders bio 

2000 births
Living people
Calgary Dinos football players
Calgary Stampeders players
Canadian football wide receivers
Players of Canadian football from British Columbia
People from Delta, British Columbia